Wang Lin (born 19 September 1987) is a Chinese footballer.

Club career
Wang Lin started his football career by playing for Sichuan Guancheng's youth team, however before he had the chance to be promoted to the first team, the club went under and was disbanded. Wang was however considered a young prospect and top tier club Shanghai United were willing to buy him for 300,000 yuan before they promoted him to their senior squad and gave him his professional debut on 23 April 2006 in a 1-1 draw against Xiamen Lanshi. As the 2006 season went on, Wang would go on to establish himself as a regular within the match day squad and play in thirteen league games. However, before the 2007 season began, Shanghai United merged with city rivals Shanghai Shenhua.

The merger of both the Shanghai clubs saw the Shanghai Shenhua have an exceptionally large squad and Wang was loaned out to S.League side Liaoning Guangyuan halfway through the 2007 season. He gained significant playing time at the club, however when the 2007 season ended, it was discovered that the club's manager and several players were taking bribes. Wang was suspected of match-fixing and was then found guilty, remaining in Singapore for four months. After returning to China in 2008, he would eventually return to playing football when he was loaned out to second tier club Pudong Zobon halfway through the 2009 season, making his debut against Nanchang Hengyuan on 10 August 2009 in a 2-0 loss. By the end of the 2009 season, he would make ten further appearances and remained at Pudong for the 2010 season where he made 16 appearances. After becoming a starter in the 2011 season for Shanghai, Wang became a squad player in the 2012 season for the club.

On 14 January 2013, Wang transferred to fellow Chinese Super League club Hangzhou Greentown. On 15 January 2016, Wang returned to Shanghai Shenhua. Shanghai Shenhua announced Wang's departure on 14 February 2019 when his contract expired.

Career statistics

Statistics accurate as of match played 20 May 2018

References

External links

1987 births
Living people
Sportspeople from Chengdu
Chinese footballers
Footballers from Sichuan
Shanghai Shenhua F.C. players
Pudong Zobon players
Zhejiang Professional F.C. players
Chinese Super League players
China League One players
Association football fullbacks